ABO Wind AG is a German energy company which develops renewable energy sources (wind, solar and biomass). ABO Wind has international offices in France, Northern Ireland, Ireland, Spain, Greece, Hungary, Argentina, Canada, Colombia, South Africa, Tunisia and Iran. In Germany, ABO Wind operates at its corporate headquarters in Wiesbaden as well as in Heidesheim near Mainz and in regional offices in Berlin, Rhineland-Palatinate, Lower Saxony, North Rhine-Westphalia as well as in Saarland. As of 2023 the company has over 900 employees and is working on projects amounting to over 2.5 gigawatts worldwide.

In January 2023 it was announced that ABO Wind are to combine wind power with green hydrogen for a refueling station for buses and lorries, in the Hessisches Kegelspiel business park in Hünfeld, Hesse, the result of over ten years of research and development into hydrogen power.

History
The beginnings of the company lie in 1996, when Jochen Ahn and Matthias Bockholt founded the planning company for the use of wind power & other renewable energies. In 2000, they converted the GmbH into a stock corporation and renamed it ABO Wind. The first part of the company name is an acronym from the last names of the founders Ahn and Bockholt.

In 1998, the first citizens' wind farm projected by ABO Wind was connected to the grid in Framersheim, Rhineland-Palatinate. The oldest subsidiary abroad is ABO Wind España S.A.U. in Valencia, founded in 2001.

Since 2014, ABO Wind has applied to build a wind farm with eleven 150m tall turbines in Aughrim, County Wicklow, Ireland. Local residents vehemently opposed the plan and formed the South Wicklow Wind Action Group (SWWAG) to campaign against it. Wicklow County Council voted to reject the wind farm They reapplied again in 2017 which was also met opposition, but in 2019 An Bord Pleanála approved the wind farm, against the recommendation of their own inspector, and as of 2022 is awaiting judicial review.

At the time it was announced that they had a "150MW portfolio consisting of 66 onshore wind turbines and one biogas plant".
In early 2019, the company announced that it was discontinuing its work in Iran.

In December 2022, the Greek subsidiary of the company completed the installation of the 50 megawatt Margariti solar farm in the Epirus regionof north-western Greece, which is scheduled for commissioning in the summer of 2023. The photovoltaic farm which uses 93,000 bifacial panels and 10 central inverter stations is expected to produce some 76 GWh of green electricity and curb an estimated 32,000 tonnes of CO2 emissions each year.

As of 2023, ABO Wind has energy farms with a total volume of more than 2.5 gigawatts of capacity under contract, and has over 900 employees, It has connected more than 800 wind, solar and battery storage facilities with a nominal capacity of just over two gigawatts to the grid in Germany, France, Finland, Spain, the United Kingdom, Greece, Hungary, Bulgaria, the Republic of Ireland and Iran.

In January 2023 it was announced that ABO Wind are to combine wind power with green hydrogen for a refueling station for buses and lorries, in the Hessisches Kegelspiel business park in Hünfeld, the result of over ten years of development into hydrogen power. Hydrogen will be produced using an electrolyzer, in which water electrolysis is powered by a wind turbine, and is expected to be able to fuel 50 lorries a day. In February 2023, ABO Wind formed an agreement with Repsol Renovables for five renewable energy projects, including three wind farms amounting to 150 megwatts, and two solar projects with a total capacity of 100 megawatts on sites in Palencia in northern Spain. Once completed in 2024 and 2025, the sites will provide electricity to 172,000 homes in the region. The company is also active in the Castile and León region of northern Spain, and between 2019 and 2022 developed a wind farm in Valladolid.

Services and supervisory board
ABO Wind has international offices in France, Northern Ireland, Ireland, Spain, Greece, Hungary, Argentina, Canada, Colombia, South Africa, Tunisia and Iran. In Germany, ABO Wind operates at its corporate headquarters in Wiesbaden as well as in Heidesheim near Mainz and in regional offices in Berlin, Rhineland-Palatinate, Lower Saxony, North Rhine-Westphalia as well as in Saarland.

ABO Wind covers all stages of renewable energy project development internationally - planning, financing, construction supervision and organization. Currently, the company is active in 16 countries on four continents. By its own account, ABO Wind is working on the development of new projects with a total capacity of more than twenty gigawatts.  In the first 20 years of the company's history, wind power was the focus of its business activities. Since 2016, ABO Wind has been increasingly involved in solar energy. For example, in a solar tender in Greece in the summer of 2018, ABO Wind secured feed-in tariffs for five solar projects with a total capacity of 45 megawatts.

As a service, the company offers commercial and technical management for wind farms, solar farms and battery storage as well as maintenance and other services. To improve the security of wind farms and to control access, the company has developed the electronic locking system ABO Lock. Usually with commissioning, ABO Wind sells the plants, for example, to energy suppliers, cooperatives or institutional investors. The company also offers the commercial management of the plants.

At the Annual General Meeting in June 2017, the shareholders elected the former Minister of Economics and Energy of Rhineland-Palatinate, Eveline Lemke, to the supervisory board. The other members of the supervisory board are: Attorney Jörg Lukowsky (chairman), Uwe Leprich, Martin Giehl and Maike Schmidt.

References

External links
 
 Financial Times

Renewable energy companies of Germany
Companies established in 1996
Companies based in Wiesbaden
Wind power companies of Germany